Rear-Admiral Jennifer J. Bennett,  is a senior Canadian Forces Naval Reserve officer. In 2011, she served as Chief of Reserves and Cadets. As such, she was the highest ranking reservist in the Canadian Armed Forces and the most senior woman in the Royal Canadian Navy. She served as commanding officer of HMCS Malahat from 1995 to 1998, and as Commander of the Naval Reserve from 2007 to 2011. She was named as one of Canada's 100 Most Powerful Women in 2011.

Honours
In 2004, Bennett was appointed an Officer of the Order of Military Merit (OMM) in recognition of "outstanding meritorious service in duties of responsibility". In 2012, she promoted to Commander of the Order of Military Merit (CMM) in recognition of "outstanding meritorious service and demonstrated leadership in duties of great responsibility".

In June 2015, Bennett was awarded an honorary Doctor of Laws (LLD) degree by the University of Alberta.

Awards and decorations
Bennett's personal awards and decorations include the following:

100px

File:QEII Diamond Jubilee Medal ribbon.svg

 CDS Commendation

References

 

 
 
 
 
 

Living people
Canadian female military personnel
Commanders of the Order of Military Merit (Canada)
Canadian admirals
Royal Canadian Navy officers
Year of birth missing (living people)